The 1906 Minnesota Senate election was held in the U.S. state of Minnesota on November 6, 1906, to elect members to the Senate of the 35th and 36th Minnesota Legislatures.

The Minnesota Republican Party won a large majority of seats, followed by the Minnesota Democratic Party and the People's Party. The new Legislature convened on January 8, 1907.

31 Republicans and 4 Democrats were uncontested.

Results

See also 

 Minnesota gubernatorial election, 1906

References 

1906 Minnesota elections
Minnesota
Minnesota Senate elections